The Extinction Event is a Big Finish Productions audio drama featuring Lisa Bowerman as Bernice Summerfield, a character from the spin-off media based on the long-running British science fiction television series Doctor Who.

Plot 
Only one object survived the destruction of the planet Halstead - a harp. Bernice visits an auction house to buy the Halstead Harp but finds that someone else also has an interest in it - and they're willing to kill...

Cast
Bernice Summerfield - Lisa Bowerman
Irving Braxiatel - Miles Richardson
Hulver - Daniel Brennan
Davon - Alexis Khan
Gulfrarg Ambassador - Mark Donovan

External links
Big Finish Productions - Professor Bernice Summerfield: The Extinction Event

Bernice Summerfield audio plays
Fiction set in the 27th century